The Church of Our Lady of Candelaria is a Roman Catholic parish church in Punta del Este, Uruguay.

The parish was established 1 February 1948.

The first temple was built in 1911. The current building dates from the mid-20th century. It is dedicated to the Virgin of Candelaria.

References

Punta del Este
1948 establishments in Uruguay
Roman Catholic church buildings in Maldonado Department
20th-century Roman Catholic church buildings in Uruguay
Buildings and structures in Punta del Este